Jose Rivera may refer to:

José Antonio Primo de Rivera (1903–1936), Spanish politician
José Eustasio Rivera (1888–1928), Colombian politician and writer
José Rivera (playwright) (born 1955), American playwright
José Antonio Rivera (born 1973), Puerto Rican-American boxer
Jose Rivera (politician) (born 1936), American politician
José Rivera (ski jumper) (born 1962), Spanish Olympic ski jumper
José Rivera (volleyball) (born 1977), Puerto Rican volleyball player
José de Rivera (1904–1985), sculptor
José Luis Rivera Guerra (born 1973), Puerto Rican politician
José Rivera Díaz, former mayor of Trujillo Alto, Puerto Rico
José Manuel Rivera (born 1986), Mexican football striker
José Rivera (arsonist), arsonist, related to the Dupont Plaza Hotel arson fire
Jose Luis Rivera (1960–2022), Puerto Rican professional wrestler
José Rivera (Peruvian footballer) (born 1997), Peruvian football winger
José Rivera (Ecuadorian footballer) (born 1963)